The 2nd Women's World Chess Championship took place during the 3rd Chess Olympiad in Hamburg. The tournament was played as a double round-robin tournament. Vera Menchik successfully defended her title. She lost her only ever Women's World Championship game to Wally Henschel. The final results were as follows:

{| class="wikitable"
! !! Player !! 1 !! 2 !! 3 !! 4 !! 5 !! Total
|- style="background:#ccffcc;"
| style="background:gold;"|1 ||  || - || ½ 1 || 0 1 || 1 1 || 1 1 || 6½
|-
| style="background:silver;"|2 ||  || ½ 0 || - || 1 0 || 1 1 || 1 1 || 5½
|-
| style="background:#cc9966;"|3 ||  || 1 0 || 0 1 || - || 1 1 || 0 ½ || 4½
|-
| 4 ||  || 0 0 || 0 0 || 0 0 || - || 1 1 || 2
|-
| 5 ||  || 0 0 || 0 0 || 1 ½ || 0 0 || - || 1½
|}

References 

Women's World Chess Championships
1930 in chess
Sports competitions in Hamburg
Chess in Germany
1930 in German sport
1930s in Hamburg
1930 in women's sport